Lord George Paget  (1818–1880) was a British Army general during the Crimean War.

George Paget may also refer to:

 George Edward Paget  (1809–1892), English physician and academic
 Henry Paget, 7th Marquess of Anglesey (George Charles Henry Victor Paget, 1922–2013), British peer

See also
George Paget Thomson (1892–1975), English physicist
George Hubert Padgett (born 1931), English cricketer